A Place to Land may refer to:

A Place to Land (Dakota Moon album), released in 2002
"Looking for a Place to Land", a single from this album
A Place to Land (Little Big Town album), released in 2007 and re-released in 2008